1985–86 was the 39th season of the Western International Hockey League.

Standings

 Nelson Maple Leafs 	40		32	 7	 1				277	157		 65
 Kimberley Dynamiters	40		25	14	 1				234	182		 51
 Elk Valley Blazers	40		20	19	 1				256	248		 41
 Cranbrook Royals	40		14	24	 2				198	243		 30
 Trail Smoke Eaters	40		 6	33	 1				177	312		 13

Playoffs

Semi finals

Best of 7
 Nelson Maple Leafs defeated Cranbrook Royals 4 games to 0 (9-0, 4-1, 12-3, 10-7).
 Elk Valley Blazers defeated Kimberley Dynamiters 4 games to 1 (9-4, 8-2, K-E, 7-6, 6-4).

Final
Best of 7
 Nelson Maple Leafs defeated Elk Valley Blazers 4 games to 2 (6-3, 4-10, 3-2, 8-1, 4-6, 5-4).

Nelson Maple Leafs win the Savage Cup and advanced to the 1985-86 Western Canada Allan Cup Playoffs.

References 

The Spokesman-Review, May 22, 1985
The Spokesman-Review - May 24, 1985

Western International Hockey League seasons
Wihl Season, 1985-86